Birchip is a closed railway station, on the Mildura railway line, in the town of Birchip, Victoria, Australia. It is 389 km from Southern Cross station, in Melbourne.

In late 1987, a number of changes occurred at Birchip, including the No.2 track booked out of service, and the abolition of a number of plunger locked points and signals, with a new Up signal provided, located at the Down end of the Wycheproof Road level crossing. Also provided around this time was a crossing loop. Further alterations occurred in March 1990, including the removal of a number of signal posts and Annett locks.

References

External links
 Melway map at street-directory.com.au

Disused railway stations in Victoria (Australia)